Nourida Gadirova Ateshi (born 22 August 1965 in Oğuz, in the Azerbaijan Soviet Socialist Republic) is an Azerbaijani author and scientist who specialises in the archaeology and prehistory of the Caucasus. As of 1995 she was living in Berlin.

Biography 
Nourida Gadirova Ateshi was born in 1965 in the village Khachmaz in the district of Oğuz, a region in the Caucasian mountains in the northern part of Azerbaijan. She began writing poetry at the age of nine. She graduated with distinction from the College of Culture and Education as well as from the University of Culture and Art in Baku. Before completing her studies and receiving the degree of a Cultural Scientist and Sociologist, she participated in various radio and television programs.  Due to her open and direct language, her liberal and democratic orientation, and her socio-critical approach her works have been banned from publishing for ten years in the Soviet time. Hence, she decided to adopt the penname “Ateshi” (“the Fiery”).

In 1995 she moved to Berlin.

She has also worked as a moderator in cultural programs with several TV and radio stations in Germany as well as a journalist for a number of Azerbaijani and Turkish media. She worked as an editor and editorial head of scientific and cultural publications in various publishing houses and magazines in Berlin (Hitit, “New Bridge”), Baku (Zerkalo / Ayna), and in some other Azerbaijani and Turkish media from 1995 until 2015.

At the same time she pursued her academic education; in 2002 she was awarded a doctorate degree by the Moscow State University of Culture and Arts (faculty of educational sciences).

In 2003 her book Unlived Womanhood was published in Azerbaijani.

In July 2003 Ateshi received Azerbaijan's highest award for media and literature, the “Golden Feather”.

Having passed the exam in history with the mark “magna cum laude” at the State Examination Board of the Institute of History of the National Academy of Sciences and being bestowed with the postdoctoral qualification in history, she changed her professional and scientific orientation to History and Archaeology.

Scientific studies 
She is focusing on scientifically investigating the prehistory and early history of the Caucasus. Within the scope of her work as a volunteer at the Museum for Culture and Art in Baku between 1989 and 1995 she dealt with historical issues and became acquainted with the structures and organization of scientific exhibitions in museums in practice.  In 1997 Ateshi started her own scientific investigations of the prehistory and early history of the Caucasus and of ancient graves of armed women.

Her research focuses mainly upon the archaeology of the Caucasus during the Late Bronze and Early Iron Ages. She is actively investigating the Khojaly-Gedebey-culture in the southern Caucasus, the historiography of the archaeology of the Caucasus, the Caucasus collections in European Museums, and ancient graves of armed women in the Caucasus.

In 2012 she was accepted as a candidate for habilitation (“doctor nauk”) at the Institute of Archaeology and Ethnology of the Azerbaijani National Academy of Sciences. The results of her scientific research carried out for more than 15 years will be included in a thesis under the title “The Place of Women in the Society and Women Warriors in the 3.-1. Millennium B.C. in the Caucasus (according to archaeological materials)”. At the end of 2011 she published a book in Berlin about the Caucasian Amazons in four languages (German, English, Russian and Azerbaijani) edited by the Azerbaijani National Academy of Sciences, providing an overview of the results of her research obtained so far.

In 2014 she became the Director of the Institute for Caucasus Research in Berlin, formerly known as the Genjevi Institute of Azerbaijani Culture which she chaired from 2003 until 2014.

In 2016 she had been preliminarily habilitated with her thesis on “The Role of Women in the History of Warfare of Azerbaijan in the 2nd and 1st millennium B.C. (according to archaeological materials)" with Prof. Dr. I. Babayev as her supervisor.

By the decision of the dissertation council the thesis was approved and defending was recommended. Due to publications of the candidate in Azerbaijan and abroad, in which she critically analyses nationalistic and Islamic oriented scientists, the defence process was stopped and could not be continued.

An appeal written and signed on October 26, 2016 by 77 academicians of the National Academy of Sciences of Azerbaijan and the representative of the scientific community, addressed to the President of the Republic of Azerbaijan, Mr. Ilham Aliyev concerning the defense of the habilitation thesis of the habilitation candidate at the Institute of Archeology and Ethnology of the National Academy of the sciences of Azerbaijan.

Since 2015 she has been lecturing at the Department of History and Archaeology of Khazar University in Baku; in 2016 she was nominated associate professor of archaeology. Besides that she is working as co-ordinator of international relations in Khazar University.

In 2018 Atəşi habilitated (Habilitation de Direction Recherches) at the University of Lyon 2 in France on “The Gedebey Culture in Azerbaijan (1300-700 BC), Proposals of its Definition and its Diffusion“. Professor Doctor Michèle Casanova was her supervisor.

Publications 

Ateshi has published 18 books and over 100 articles on culture, history, non-fiction and literature in Azerbaijani, Turkish, Russian, English and German. During the last ten years she has focused on scientific investigations of the history and archaeology of the Caucasus.

Her works are listed in the catalogues of the Leipzig National Library and Dresden National Library in Germany.  In Azerbaijan they are registered  in the National Library and the State Archive of Azerbaijan.

Many of her poems are published in the German anthology “Prosa und Lyrik unserer Zeit” (prose and poetry of our time) (published in Karin Fischer Verlag). Under the heading “Butterfly & Flame” (Matthes & Seitz, Berlin 2008), together with Jan Weinert she published translations and adaptations of ancient Azerbaijani love poetry from more than 1000 years to German. Many of her poems were used as lyrics for songs in Azerbaijan, Turkey and Iran, and some of them became hits. Her book of poetry “Fire daughter” (published in German) provided the basis for an instrumental composition, which was performed for the first time in Detmold in 2009.

The most important books by Nourida Gadirova-Ateshi:

"Hunter on the run from his prey" ("Avindan kaçan avcı"), Turkish. 1997, Berlin: Hitit, 
 "Hunter on the run from his prey" ("Jäger auf der Flucht vor seiner Beute"), German. 2002, Berlin: Wagemann, 
 "Now I'm here!" ("Indi men varam!"). 2004, Berlin: Hitit; 
 "Screams of choked feelings" ("Schreie erstickter Gefühle"). 2006, Berlin:Hitit, 
 "Original translations - Translations of German literature to Azerbaijani" ("Orijinaldan tercümeler"). 2006, Baku: Nurlan; 
 "Come, let us be sinful" ("Gel günaha bataq"). 2006, Baku: Nurlan (bestseller), 
 "Struggle over Nagorno-Karabakh"  ("Kampf um Bergkarabach-in German"). 2007, Berlin: GIB, 
 "Mohammed Essad Bey: Secrets of the last hundred years" ("Yüz ilin sirleri"). Baku: 2007, Nurlan, 
 in cooperation with Jan Weinert “Butterfly & Flame" A Thousand Years of Azerbaijani Love Poetry (Original texts with free German adaptation). 2008, Berlin:  Matthes & Seitz, 
 "Fire daughter" ("Feuertochter").  (Poems) (in German). 2009, Aachen: Karin Fischer Verlag, 
 "The Caucasian Amazons – the true history behind the myths" (in German, English, Russian and Azerbaijani, edited by the National Academy of Sciences of Azerbaijan. 2011, Berlin: GIB, 
Finds of the Khojaly-Gedebey Culture of the late Bronze and early Iron Ages in Azerbaijan in European museums. Monograph   (Azerbaijani with abstracts in English, Russian and German). 2015, Baku: Elm ve tehsil, 300pp., 
Archaeological Caucasus collections in European Museums, Textbook (Azerbaijani with abstracts in English, Russian and German).2016, Baku: “OL” npkt, 452 pp.; 
History of the Archaeology of the Caucasus. Archaeological and theoretical research. Monograph. Russian with Engl. abstr. 2017, Baku:Khazar, 418pp.,

References

External links
https://khazar.academia.edu/NouridaAteshi

Azerbaijani archaeologists
1965 births
Living people
Azerbaijani art historians